Blaggers ITA (formerly The Blaggers) were a British punk rock band founded in 1988. Main vocalist Matty 'Blagg' Roberts had previously fronted Oi! band Complete Control, who released an LP on Oi! Records in 1985 Blaggers ITA were noted for their strong anti-fascist and left wing lyrics and activism.

Although the band initially played in a generic Oi! style, they later added a trumpet player and incorporated influences from hip hop and electronic dance music, including sampling, and added the letters ITA to their name ("In The Area"), inspired by Adrian Sherwood's On-U Sound Records.

The band had close links with Anti Fascist Action (AFA), donating money to the organisation and promoting its ideology. The band's support for revolutionary politics and AFA meant that in the early 1990s there were part of direct action against Neo-Nazi groups such as Blood & Honour and C18.

In 1993 they signed a record deal with EMI and enjoyed some commercial success with three minor hit singles. Stresss and Oxygen benefitted from promotional videos, while Abandon Ship saw an appearance on The Word.

The record deal resulted in some criticism due to EMI's status as a major label and large corporation, and its former links with the arms trade. In a debate strongly echoed four years later in the case of Chumbawamba, the band justified the move with the argument that the financial and promotional support of EMI would enable their political message to reach a wider public; they also argued that the deal gave the band more money to spend on political causes. For example, money earmarked for promotional events was used on full page adverts in the national music press promoting direct physical anti-fascist action, while creative use of tour support funds went to aid political groups throughout the country.

In mid 1993, the group embarked on a high-profile UK tour supporting Manic Street Preachers. In July 1993, frontman Matty Blagg allegedly punched Melody Maker writer Dave Simpson, as a consequence of Simpson stating that Matty could never reform his fascist past (as a teenager Matty had been associated with the British Movement but while in prison was enlightened by another prisoner and subsequently dedicated the rest of his life to educating others) resulting in a court appearance and the case being dismissed. No trial took place. The incident led to the cancellation of festival slots (inc. main stage slots at Reading and Glastonbury), an effective boycott by the music press, and the consequent cancellation of their EMI contract.

Shortly afterwards Matty Roberts left the band, which for a short time continued without him. Roberts died on 22 February 2000.

A new version of the band named Blaggers AKA formed in 2002. This line up has played gigs and festivals across Europe, including benefits for the Independent Working Class Association and Antifa groups, but has not released any records.

Lineup

Early-1990s lineup
 Matty Blagg - lead vocals
 Christy Robson - rapper/DJ
 Steve Serious - guitar
 Paul The Pig - guitar
 Matt Vinyl - bass
 Jason 'Wrist Action Jackson' Cook - drums
 Brendan 'Rimmer' Hodges - trumpet, samples and design (credited SIT Inc)
 Carlos Coutinho - keyboards

Other musicians
 Bilko - second vocalist (1988–1989)
 Jez the Jester - drums (1988–1989)
 Cab - drums (1989)
 Gary the Squatter - guitar (1989–1990)
 Olaf - sax (1992) + sax and vocalist (since 2001)
 Marcel - guitar (since 2001)
 Brian Hayes - guitar (1993-1996)

Discography

Albums
 On Yer Toez (released as The Blaggers) (1989) 
 Blaggamuffin (1991) [mini-LP] 
 Fuck Fascism, Fuck Capitalism, Society's Fucked (1991) 
 God Save the Cockroach (1992) [mini-LP, aka New Kids On The Blag] 
 United Colours of Blaggers ITA (1993) 
 Bad Karma (1994)

Singles and EPs
 "It's Up To You" (1990)
 Beirut EP (1990)
 "Victory to ANC" (flexi disc, 1991)
 "Here's Johnny" (1992)
 "The Way We Operate" (1992)
 "Wildside" (bootleg credited to Ramraiders ITA, 1993)
 "Stresss" (1993)
 "Oxygen" (1993)
 "Abandon Ship" (1993)
 "Mantrap" (1994)
 "Thrill Her With a Gun/Dairy Thief" (1995)
 "Rumblefish/Death by Cool" (1995)
 "Guns Of Brixton" (1995)
 "Session" (1995)

References

External links
 Official site
 Blaggers ITA on Myspace
 Blaggers ITA on Facebook
 Blaggers fansite
 Blaggers ITA at discogs.com
 Mini bio of The Blaggers on Stage Bottles site

British punk rock groups
British socialists
Street punk groups
Oi! groups
Political music groups